Jeffrey M. Ramsdell (born December 4, 1955) is a judge of the Superior Court of Washington for King County (Seattle).

References

External links
 Opinion in the Jimi Hendrix estate case
 The Honorable Jeffrey M. Ramsdell

Washington (state) state court judges
Living people
Place of birth missing (living people)
1955 births